Henry Allan Gleason may refer to:
Henry A. Gleason (botanist) (1882–1975), American ecologist, botanist and taxonomist
Henry Allan Gleason (linguist) (1917–2007), his son, linguist